Jorge Aparicio Estrada (born May 27, 1989) is a Mexican professional footballer who played for Sonora of Ascenso MX on loan from Celaya.

References

1989 births
Living people
Footballers from Mexico City
Cimarrones de Sonora players
Liga MX players
Association football midfielders
Mexican footballers